Saleerat Srimek (born 10 March 1973) is a Thai sprinter. She competed in the women's 4 × 400 metres relay at the 1992 Summer Olympics.

References

1973 births
Living people
Athletes (track and field) at the 1992 Summer Olympics
Saleerat Srimek
Saleerat Srimek
Place of birth missing (living people)
Asian Games medalists in athletics (track and field)
Saleerat Srimek
Athletes (track and field) at the 1994 Asian Games
Medalists at the 1994 Asian Games
Olympic female sprinters
Saleerat Srimek
Saleerat Srimek
Southeast Asian Games medalists in athletics
Saleerat Srimek